Hella Joof (born 1 November 1962) is a Danish actress and director. She was born to a Danish mother and an aristocratic Gambian father who belonged to the Joof dynasty. 

Joof directed En kort en lang (2001), Oh Happy Day (2004) and Fidibus (2006). Her feature film debut En kort en lang was seen by ten percent of the Danish population, and her second feature Oh Happy Day, was sold to Disney for a US remake. Shake It All About was entered into the 24th Moscow International Film Festival. She has hosted Bullerfnis and other children's TV-programs, but was also the voice of the title character in the hardcore pornographic film Constance (1998). 

As an actress, Joof is best known for award-winning performances as supporting characters in such comedies as Hannibal & Jerry (1997), Den eneste ene (1999), and Humørkort-stativ-sælgerens søn (2002). Joof appears as one of the three judges in the Television Show Talent 09 a Danish adaption of Britain's Got Talent.

In 2016, her film Almost Perfect (2012, Sover Dolly på ryggen?) was aired in Latin America, the United States and Africa by the TV channel Eurochannel.

Filmography

See also
 List of female film and television directors
 List of LGBT-related films directed by women

References

External links 
 
 
 Hella Joof's Almost Perfect on
 Eurochannel.

1962 births
Living people
Danish film directors
Danish film actresses
Danish women film directors
Danish women screenwriters
People from Rudersdal Municipality
Danish people of Gambian descent